Calstock railway station is an unstaffed railway station on the Tamar Valley Line serving the village of Calstock in Cornwall, United Kingdom.  It is situated at the north end of Calstock Viaduct which carries the railway at high level over the River Tamar.

History

The  gauge East Cornwall Mineral Railway was opened to Kelly Quay at Calstock on 8 May 1872.  Wagons with goods from the mines around Gunnislake and Callington were brought down the hillside on a  cable-worked incline with a gradient of 1 in 6 (17%).

The Plymouth, Devonport and South Western Junction Railway opened the station on 2 March 1908.  This line was a branch from Bere Alston to Callington Road and crossed the River Tamar on Calstock Viaduct.

It was connected to the station goods yard by a second parallel steel stub viaduct. A short section of the narrow gauge line was retained to serve a lime kiln, but the wagon lift and all the sidings were taken out of use in September 1934.

Fruit and flowers were an important part of the traffic carried on the railway and were still carried by train from Calstock until the mid-1970s.

Platform layout
The single platform – on the right of trains arriving from Plymouth – is situated on a sharp curve which makes it difficult to see trains approaching from Gunnislake.

Services

Connections with main line services can be made at Plymouth.

Community railway
The railway from Plymouth to Gunnislake is designated as a community railway and is supported by marketing provided by the Devon and Cornwall Rail Partnership.  The line is promoted under the "Tamar Valley Line" name.

Two pubs in Calstock take part in the Tamar Valley Line rail ale trail, which is designed to promote the use of the line. The line is also part of the Dartmoor Sunday Rover network of integrated bus and rail routes.

Calstock Viaduct

It was built between 1904 and 1907 by John Lang of Liskeard using 11,148 concrete blocks.  These were cast in a temporary yard on the Devon bank opposite the village.  The engineers were Richard Church and W. R. Galbraith.

It is a Grade II* listed structure.

The construction of the viaduct provided the background to the 1939 novel The Viaduct by Victor Canning, set in the fictional village of Caradon which was closely modelled on Calstock.

References

 
 
 
 Devon and Cornwall Rail Partnership (2006), Tamar Valley Line Rail Ale Trail

External links

Footage of the railway station
Calstock Railway Viaduct video footage

Railway stations in Cornwall
Former Plymouth, Devonport and South Western Junction Railway stations
Railway stations in Great Britain opened in 1908
Railway stations served by Great Western Railway
1908 establishments in England
DfT Category F2 stations